Avant-garde jazz (also known as avant-jazz and experimental jazz) is a style of music and improvisation that combines avant-garde art music and composition with jazz. It originated in the early 1950s and developed through to the late 1960s. Originally synonymous with free jazz, much avant-garde jazz was distinct from that style.

History

1950s
Avant-garde jazz originated in the mid- to late 1950s among a group of improvisors who rejected the conventions of bebop and post bop in an effort to blur the division between the written and the spontaneous. Ornette Coleman and Cecil Taylor led the way, soon to be joined by John Coltrane. Some would come to apply it differently from free jazz, emphasizing structure and organization by the use of composed melodies, shifting but nevertheless predetermined meters and tonalities, and distinctions between soloists and accompaniment.

1960s
In Chicago, the Association for the Advancement of Creative Musicians began pursuing their own variety of avant-garde jazz. The AACM musicians (Muhal Richard Abrams, Anthony Braxton, Roscoe Mitchell, Hamid Drake, and the Art Ensemble of Chicago) tended towards eclecticism. Poet Amiri Baraka, an important figure in the Black Arts Movement (BAM), recorded spoken word tracks with the New York Art Quartet (“Black Dada Nihilismus,” 1964, ESP) and Sonny Murray (“Black Art,” 1965, Jihad).

See also

Free jazz
European free jazz
BYG Actuel
ESP-Disk
Jazz fusion

References

Bibliography
 Berendt, Joachim E. (1992). The Jazz Book: From Ragtime to Fusion and Beyond. Revised by Günther Huesmann, translated by H. and B. Bredigkeit with Dan Morgenstern. Brooklyn: Lawrence Hill Books. 
 Kofsky, Frank (1970). Black Nationalism and the Revolution in Music. New York: Pathfinder Press.
 Mandel, Howard (2008). Miles, Ornette, Cecil:  Jazz Beyond Jazz. Preface by Greg Tate. New York City: Routledge. 

Jazz genres
Jazz
1950s in music
1960s in music
20th-century music genres